Journal of Optics may refer to
Journal of Optics (IOP Publishing journal), a journal published by IOP Publishing on behalf of the European Optical Society:
Journal of Optics A: Pure and Applied Optics
Journal of Optics B: Quantum and Semiclassical Optics

Not to be confused with:
Journal of Modern Optics
Journal of the Optical Society of America A
Journal of the Optical Society of America B